Benkovski is a village in Southern Bulgaria, located in Maritsa Municipality, Plovdiv Province. The village, as of June 2020, has a population of 1273 people, registered with a current address there.

Geography 
Benkovski is located in the Upper Thracian Plain with an elevation of 163 meters above sea level. It is situated 12 kilometers South West from Plovdiv. The total area of the village is 1689,3 hectares.

The main two harvests the villagers gather are carrots and potatoes.

History 
The earliest sources state that the village was created around 1576 under the initial name of Marzyan. In 1939, the village was renamed as Benkovski. It used to be a Municipality with three other villages under it - Benkovski, Radinovo and Voisil.

Infrastructure 
A large part of the population works in the nearby village Radinovo due to the well-developed industrial area there.

Public edifices 

 Church "Sv. Troitsa" was built during 1880. In 1975 the church was announced as a cultural monument of national heritage due to its murals and its altar.
 Public hall and library - "Vasil Levski", built in 1930. 
 The primary school's name is "Georgi Benkovski" and was built in 1927.

References 

Villages in Plovdiv Province